Onisi Ratave (born 6 June 1992) is a Fijian rugby union player who plays for Benetton Rugby in United Rugby Championship. His playing position is centre or wing.He is a fireman by profession.Having to play for Rewa and Namosi in the skipper cup competition.

Early life
Ratave is a native of Gau Island in Fiji.

Rugby career

Provincial rugby career
Ratave played for Namosi in the Skipper Cup, the Fiji Rugby Union's national provincial rugby union championship.

Ratave signed for the Bay of Plenty Steamers for the 2021 Bunnings National Provincial Championship. In his next match, on 19 September against , he scored two tries in a narrow 36–33 defeat.

Super Rugby
On 21 September 2021 alongside Napolioni Bolaca, Tevita Ikanivere, Nemani Nagusa, and Simione Kuruvoli, Ratave was announced as one of the Fijian Drua's first five signings ahead of the 2022 Super Rugby Pacific season.

International rugby
Ratave has formed part of extended squads of the Fiji sevens and Fiji national team.

Reference list

External links
Itsrugby.co.uk profile

Fijian rugby union players
Living people
Rugby union centres
Rugby union wings
Bay of Plenty rugby union players
Fijian Drua players
1992 births
Benetton Rugby players